Phracyps is a genus of moths of the family Xyloryctidae from the Madagascar.

Species
Phracyps lebisella Viette, 1955
Phracyps longifasciella Viette, 1955
Phracyps waterloti Viette, 1952

References

Xyloryctidae
Xyloryctidae genera